Molly Bawn is an 1878 novel by the Irish writer Margaret Wolfe Hungerford. In 1916 it was adapted into a silent film of the same title starring Alma Taylor. The novel is the origin of the expression "Beauty is in the eye of the beholder".

References

Bibliography
 Goble, Alan. The Complete Index to Literary Sources in Film. Walter de Gruyter, 1999.

1878 British novels
English-language novels
Novels set in Ireland
British novels adapted into films
Irish novels adapted into films
19th-century Irish novels
Bawn, Molly
Bawn, Molly